Detroit Internet Exchange ("DET-iX") is a Nonprofit 501(c)(6) Internet exchange point (IXP) located in Southfield, Michigan. It was founded in 2014 to help establish peering for local and regional Internet service providers. DET-iX currently has 72 members, with a maximum peak transfer speed of 1350.1 Gbit/s. DET-iX is the first peering exchange of its kind in the Detroit area.

The DET-iX switching fabric consists of multiple high capacity switches interconnected together. DET-iX members connect via 1, 10, 25 or a 100G ports. Members can pass traffic directly between one another, rather than purchasing through a third party provider. Further, the traffic stays local via the IXP as opposed to being routed in another major city.

Services
 Bilateral Peering
 Route Servers
 IPv4 and IPv6 Peering
 Purchase upstream from multiple Tier 1 networks

Peering Locations 

 123Net - 24700 Northwestern Hwy. Southfield, MI
 123Net - 24275 Northwestern Hwy. Southfield, MI
 123Net - 24245 Northwestern Hwy. Southfield, MI
 365 Data Centers - 24660 Lahser Rd. Southfield, MI
 EdgeConneX - 21005 Lahser Rd. Southfield, MI
 Meet Me Room - 100 Renaissance Center, Detroit, MI

Statistics 

 Peak in/out data transfer speed: 1350.1 Gbit/s as of February 2023
 Daily average data transfer speed: 662.6 Gbit/s as of February 2023

See also 
 List of Internet exchange points
List of Internet exchange points by size

References

Internet exchange points in the United States